Smixi is an Aromanian village and a former community in Grevena regional unit, West Macedonia, Greece. Since the 2011 local government reform it is part of the municipality Grevena, of which it is a municipal unit. Smixi had a population of 454 people as of 2011. The municipal unit of Smixi covers an area of 25.292 km2.

See also
List of settlements in the Grevena regional unit

References

External links
Regional unit of Grevena: Smixi

Populated places in Grevena (regional unit)
Former municipalities in Western Macedonia
Aromanian settlements in Greece